Live at the Y.M.C.A 27-10-79 is a live album by industrial/post-punk band Cabaret Voltaire, recorded in 1979 and originally released in 1980 by Rough Trade. It was re-released on CD in 1990 on Mute Records in the UK and on Restless Records in the US. The album contains a cover of The Velvet Underground's "Here She Comes Now" from their album White Light/White Heat.

Reception

Wilson Neate in AllMusic said, "Although this album isn't easy listening -- and of course it wasn't intended to be -- it documents Cabaret Voltaire's role as electro-industrial pioneers. Marc Ross at Trouser Press asserted that Live at the YMCA was more accessible than their debut album Mix-Up, going on to say: "There are strong intelligences at work here. What's fascinating is that live they maintain the style and imagination displayed in the studio... and absorb ambient sounds (audience, hall) into their music."

Track listing
All songs written by Cabaret Voltaire except for "No Escape", by Sky Saxon and "Here She Comes Now", by Lou Reed.

"Untitled" - 5:51
"On Every Other Street" - 4:16
"Nag, Nag, Nag" - 4:55
"The Set Up" - 4:13
"Expect Nothing" - 6:18
"Havoc" - 3:02
"Here She Comes Now" - 4:12
"No Escape" - 3:42
"Baader Meinhof" - 4:10

Notes
Recorded on a cassette player October 27, 1979 and cut at Portland Recording Studios.Track 1 was later recorded and included in the LP The Voice of America under the title "Damage Is Done."

Personnel
Cabaret Voltaire
 Chris Watson - electronic tape
 Stephen Mallinder - bass, percussion, vocals
 Richard H. Kirk - guitar, wind instruments

References

Cabaret Voltaire (band) live albums
1979 live albums
Rough Trade Records live albums